The Archdeacon of Middlesex is a senior cleric in the Church of England, co-responsible for the Archdeaconry of "Middlesex", which mirrors the "Kensington" episcopal area of the Diocese of London — the other person responsible being the Bishop of Kensington.

History
The ancient archdeaconry has been a division of London diocese since archdeaconries were first created in England in the 12th century. Historically it covered most of London other than the City of London and the East End. It was for ten years in the Marian-period (Roman Catholic) Diocese of Westminster from 1540, then re-absorbed back into the London diocese in 1550 as the church parted, for the final time, from Rome. It was split on 23 July 1912 to create the Archdeaconry of Hampstead and since further split to create the Archdeaconries of Northolt (in 1970) and of Charing Cross (in ).

List of archdeacons

High Medieval
bef. 1102–aft. 1106: Robert
bef. 1108–bef. 1127 (d.): Roger son of Robert
bef. 1127–aft. 1142: Richard de Belmeis (II; Richard of Beaumais)
bef. 1127–1138 (deprived): Hugh (opposed Belmeis; deprived)
bef. 1153–1180: Ralph de Diceto
John of Canterbury (Pope's candidate opposite Diceto)
aft. 1180: Richard Foliot (I)
bef. 1181–aft. 1196: Gilbert Foliot (II)
aft. 1198–aft. 1203: Ralph of Ely
bef. 1218–aft. 1227: William of Sainte-Mère-Église (II)
bef. 1228–aft. 1228: Reginald
bef. 1231–aft. 1236: Robert de Bonewell
bef. 1242–aft. 1243 (d.): John de Norton
April 1244–bef. 1246: Fulk Basset, also called Fulk de Sandford 
bef. 1248–aft. 1259: Richard Foliot  (II)
bef. 1262–bef. 1268 (d.): Henry de Wengham (II)
bef. 1268–1276 (res.): Thomas Ingoldsthorpe
bef. 1278–1294 (res.): Ralph Baldock
24 April 1295 – 1301 (deprived): Ralph de Malling (deprived by the bishop)

Late Medieval
bef. 1303–1317 (res.): Richard Newport
bef. 1303–24 November 1326 (dep.): Robert Baldock
3 December 1326–aft. 1326: Roger de Hales
1327–November 1333 (exch.): Thomas de Astley
bef. 1328–aft. 1330: Edmund Trussel (probably resigned)
aft. 1331–?: Thomas Trussel (probably never gained possession)
November 1333–bef. 1337 (d.): Robert de Reddeswell
16 August 1337–bef. 1342: Thomas Durant
bef. 1342–bef. 1349 (d.): Henry de Idesworth
1349: Roger Holme (unsuccessful provision)
1349–bef. 1358 (d.): Andrew de Offord
1358–7 June 1361 (d.): Pierre Cardinal de la Forêt (Cardinal-priest of Santi Apostoli)
1361–1362 (d.): William de Palmorna
bef. 1363–15 June 1364 (exch.): Adam Thebaud of Sudbury
15 June 1364–bef. 1393 (d.): Bartholomew Sidey
10 May 1393 – 1416 (d.): William Stortford
20 November 1416–bef. 1418 (d.): Richard Bruton
2 May 1418–bef. 1422 (d.): Richard Clifford  (junior)
16 September 1422–bef. 1429 (d.): Simon Northew
2 May 1429–bef. 1441 (res.): William Booth
9 November 1441 – 15 April 1443 (exch.): Stephen Wilton
15 April 1443–aft. 1462: Robert Wyott
aft. 1462–bef. 1475 (d.): John Wodde
16 November 1475 – 1476 (res.): William Dudley
30 October 1476–bef. 1497 (d.): Richard Lichfield
8 March 1497–bef. 1516 (d.): John Aleyne (or Carver)
From 17 December 1540, the archdeaconry formed the Diocese of Westminster.
11 August 1516–bef. 1551 (d.): Richard Eden
In 1550, the whole Westminster diocese and Middlesex archdeaconry was returned to London diocese.

Early modern
9 April 1551 – 1554 (res.): Henry Hervie
11 April 1554–bef. 1556 (d.): John Wymmesley
10 October 1556 – 23 October 1559 (deprived): William Chedsey (committed to The Tower, 20 May 1560)
1 January–November 1560 (res.): Alexander Nowell
31 January 1561 – 1577 (d.): Thomas Watts
12 June 1577–bef. 1588 (d.): Adam Squire
26 October 1588 – 1595 (res.): Richard Vaughan
11 February 1596–bef. 1602 (d.): Richard Webster
9 March 1602–bef. 1616 (d.): Robert Tighe
23 September 1616 – 11 June 1620 (d.): William Goodwin
16 June 1620–bef. 1660 (d.): Richard Cluet
20 July 1660 – 20 November 1669 (d.): Robert Pory
7 December 1669–bef. 1679 (d.): Thomas Cook
7 October 1679–bef. 1686 (res.): William Jane
13 June 1686 – 5 August 1690 (d.): John Goodman
8 September 1690 – 1691 (res.): Robert Grove
1691–2 March 1705 (d.): Robert Corey
29 March 1705 – 4 February 1717 (d.): William Lancaster
9 February 1717 – 27 February 1730 (d.): Roger Altham
13 August 1730 – 23 December 1740 (d.): Daniel Waterland
6 May 1741 – 26 April 1764 (d.): Fifield Allen
1 May 1764–bef. 1780 (res.): John Hotham
8 January 1780–bef. 1781 (res.): George Jubb
7 September 1781 – 14 February 1806 (d.): Stephen Eaton
12 March 1806–bef. 1840 (res.): George Cambridge
19 August 1840 – 1842 (res.): William Hale (afterwards Archdeacon of London, 1842)
20 January–November 1843 (res.): John Lonsdale
13 January 1844 – 22 May 1875 (d.): John Sinclair

Late modern
June 1875–24 December 1892 (d.): James Hessey
1893–1903 (res.): Robinson Thornton
1903–1930 (ret.): Henry Bevan
1930–1933 (ret.): Norman Thicknesse (afterwards archdeacon emeritus)
1933–September 1953 (ret.): Stephen Phillimore (afterwards archdeacon emeritus)
1953–1966 (res.): Anthony Morcom
1966–1973 (res.): John Eastaugh (afterwards Bishop of Hereford, 1973)
1974–1975 (res.): Derek Hayward (afterwards archdeacon emeritus)
1975–1982 (res.): John Perry
1983–1996 (ret.): Tim Raphael
1996–2005 (res.): Malcolm Colmer
14 May 200630 November 2019 (ret.): Stephan Welch
23 March 2020present: Richard Frank

Notes

References

Sources

Lists of Anglicans
 
Lists of English people